This article features the list of awards and nominations received by Albanian pop and R&B singer Elvana Gjata.

Balkan Music Awards 
 
The Balkan Music Awards is an annual music award ceremony organised by Balkanika Music Television celebrating the most successful in music from the Balkan countries. Gjata won two out of four nominations, including Music Video of the Year and Best Song in the Balkans from Albania for 2012 for "Afër dhe Larg".

|-
|rowspan="2"|2012
|rowspan="2"|"Afër dhe Larg"
|Best Music Video in the Balkans
|
|-
|Best Song in the Balkans from Albania
|
|-
||2011
||"Mamani Nejen" (feat. Fugaa)
|Best Song in the Balkans from Albania
|
|-
||2010
||"Turn U On"
|Best Song in the Balkans from Albania
|
|}

Dancing with the Stars 

|-
||2012
||"Elvana Gjata"
|First Prize
|
|}

Kënga Magjike 

Kënga Magjike is an annual competition, broadcasting every year since its debut in 1999, and the second longest-running television competition in Albania. Gjata participated two times in the competition, first in 2007 and after two years in 2009, where she finished in the third and second place, respectively.

|-
|rowspan="2"|2007
|rowspan="2"|"Ku Jeton Dashuria"
|Discography Award
|
|-
|Third Place
|
|-
|rowspan="2"|2009
|rowspan="2"|"Dhe Zemra Ndal" 
|Internet Award
|
|-
|Second Place
|
|}

Prive Klan Kosova 

|-
||2015
||"Herself"
|Person of The Year
|
|}

Top Music Awards 

|-
|rowspan="4"|2016
|rowspan="3"|"Love me (feat.Bruno)"
|My Music Hit of the Year
|
|-
|Collaboration of the Year
|
|-
|Song of the Year
|
|-
|rowspan="1"|"Elvana Gjata"
|Female Artist of the Year
|
|}

Top Fest 

|-
|rowspan="2"|2011
|rowspan="2"|"Me Ty"
|Best Female
|
|-
|First Prize
|
|}

Videofest Awards 

|-
|rowspan="2"|2014
|rowspan="2"|"Disco Disco" (feat. KAOS)
|Best Duo
|
|-
|Best Dance Music Video
|
|-
|rowspan="4"|2013
|rowspan="4"|"Beso" (feat. 2Po2)
| Music Video of the Year
|
|-
|Best Direction
|
|-
|Best R&B Music Video
|
|-
|Best Duo
|
|-
|rowspan="3"|2012
|rowspan="3"|"Afer dhe Larg"
|Best Female Video
|
|-
|Best Dance Music Video
|
|-
|Best Styling
|
|-
|rowspan="2"|2011
|rowspan="2"|"Mamani Nejen" (feat. Fugaa)
|Music Video of the Year
|
|-
|Best R&B Music Video
|
|-
|rowspan="3"|2010
|rowspan="3"|"Hitech"
|Best Female Video
|
|-
|Best R&B Music Video
|
|-
|Best Special Effects
|
|-
|rowspan="6"|2009
|rowspan="5"|"Nuk Janë Më"
|Music Video of the Year
|
|-
|Best Female Video
|
|-
|Best Direction
|
|-
|Best Editing
|
|-
|Best Special Effects
|
|-
||"Vetes"
|Best Pop Music Video
|
|-
|rowspan="4"|2008
|rowspan="4"|"Mamës"
|Music Video of the Year
|
|-
|Best Female Video
|
|-
|Best R&B Music Video
|
|-
|Best Direction
|
|-
||2007
||"Të Dy" (with Tingulli 3nt)
|Best Rap/Hip-Hop Video
|
|}

Zhurma Show Awards 

|-
||2006
||"T2(feat.Tingulli 3nt)"
|Best Hip Hop & R&B
|
|-
||2009
||"Turn U On"
|Best Dance Song 
|
|-
|rowspan="2"|2010
|rowspan="2"|"A Ke Ti Zemër"
|Best Female Dance Artist
|
|-
|Best Female
|
|-
|rowspan="2"|2011
|rowspan="2"|"Afër dhe larg"
|Best Song
|
|-
|Best Dance
|
|-
|rowspan="2"|2013
|rowspan="2"|"Beso (feat. 2Po2)"
|Best Performance
|
|-
|Best Video
|
|-
|rowspan="2"|2015
|rowspan="2"|"Love me (feat.Bruno)"
|Best Pop
|
|-
|Best Song
|
|-
||2016
||"Njesoj"
|Best Pop 
|
|}

References 

Awards
Gjata, Elvana